Church of the Atonement, is an historic Carpenter Gothic Episcopal summer chapel in Fish Creek, Wisconsin, within the Episcopal Diocese of Fond du Lac. On March 7, 1985, it was added to the National Register of Historic Places.

History
The church was built in 1878 on the foundation of a fisherman's unfinished house, with lumber donated by Mrs. L. M. Griswold, wife of a local sawmill owner. The style is Carpenter Gothic, with exterior of board and batten and wood shingles.

The congregation initially had twenty members, led by Mrs. Griswold and Sara Jeffcoat, a widowed schoolteacher. Early on the congregation was served by Reverend Joseph Jameson who was shared with congregations at Jacksonport, Algoma and Sturgeon Bay.

In 1985 the building was added to the National Register of Historic Places for its religious and architectural significance.

Today the church offers worship services in summer only, because the building remains unheated. Rotating clergy serve each Sunday morning.

See also

 List of Registered Historic Places in Wisconsin

References

External links
Church of the Atonement holds services to mark centennial, Door County Advocate, August 8, 1978

Churches on the National Register of Historic Places in Wisconsin
Atonement
Churches in Door County, Wisconsin
Carpenter Gothic church buildings in Wisconsin
National Register of Historic Places in Door County, Wisconsin
1878 establishments in Wisconsin